Ernestine Tahedl (born 1940) is a Canadian painter.

Born in Vienna, Tahedl studied at the Academy of Applied Arts Vienna, receiving her master of arts in graphic arts in 1961. For the next two years she worked with her father, Heinrich Tahedl, on the design and execution of stained glass pieces, before her emigration to Canada. She produced a portfolio of etchings, Circle of Energy, in 1981, and did restoration work on the church of Christ the King in Klagenfurt in 1989; otherwise she is best known for her abstract landscapes.  She has exhibited throughout Canada, the United States, and Europe both in solo shows and group exhibitions, and her work is in numerous public, private, and corporate collections.  In 1967 she received a Canada Council arts award; in 1967, she was the recipient of a purchase award at the Concours Artistiques du Québec, and in 1966 she was awarded the Royal Architectural Institute of Canada's allied arts medal. In 1963 she won a bronze medal at the Vienna International Exhibition of Paintings; she has also received other awards throughout her career.

References

1940 births
Living people
20th-century Canadian painters
20th-century Canadian women artists
21st-century Canadian painters
21st-century Canadian women artists
Artists from Vienna
Austrian women painters
Austrian emigrants to Canada
Canadian landscape painters
Canadian women painters
University of Applied Arts Vienna alumni